The Merry Vineyard is a 1927 German silent comedy film directed by Jacob Fleck and Luise Fleck and starring Rudolf Rittner, Camilla Horn and Lotte Neumann. It was based on a play by Carl Zuckmayer, which was remade in 1952 as a sound film.

The film's art direction was by Oscar Friedrich Werndorff.

Cast
 Rudolf Rittner as Jean Baptiste Gunderloch
 Camilla Horn as Klärchen Gunderloch, daughter of above
 Lotte Neumann as Annemarie Most, housekeeper of Jean Baptiste 
 Gyula Szőreghy as Eismayr, landlord of Landskrone inn
 Camilla von Hollay as Babettchen Eismayr
 Fritz Odemar as Knuzius, fiancée of Klärchen
 Carl de Vogt as Jochen Most skipper on the Rhine
 Heinrich Gotho as Rindsfuß, wine merchant
 Karl Harbacher as Stenz, wine merchant
 Bodo Serp as Vogelsberger - wine merchant
 Elisabeth Neumann-Viertel as Frl. Stenz
 Friedrich Lobe as Hahnesand, traveller for a wine firm
 Oscar Ebelsbacher as Löbche Bär, traveller for a wine firm
 Paul Morgan as Meyer & Sohn
 Karl Gerhardt as Kurrle, registrar and auctioneer 
 Else Reval as Ms. Rindsfuß
 Geza L. Weiss as son of Meyer

References

Bibliography 
 Goble, Alan. The Complete Index to Literary Sources in Film. Walter de Gruyter, 1999.

External links 
 

1927 films
Films of the Weimar Republic
1920s German-language films
German silent feature films
Films directed by Jacob Fleck
Films directed by Luise Fleck
German films based on plays
Films based on works by Carl Zuckmayer
German black-and-white films
1927 comedy films
German comedy films
Silent comedy films
1920s German films